Adrienn Szarka (born 28 June 1991) is a retired Hungarian handballer who plays for Alba Fehérvár KC in left wing position.

Achievements

Nemzeti Bajnokság I:
Winner: 2015
Silver Medalist: 2012, 2016, 2017
Bronze Medalist: 2011
Magyar Kupa:
Winner: 2017
Bronze Medalist: 2009
EHF Cup Winners' Cup:
Winner: 2011, 2012

References

External links

 Adrienn Szarka player profile on Ferencvárosi TC Official Website
 Adrienn Szarka career statistics at Worldhandball

1991 births
Living people
People from Kiskunhalas
Hungarian female handball players
Sportspeople from Bács-Kiskun County